The Bassa Friulana is a low-lying and level area of Friuli, specifically the very southern part of the provincies of Pordenone, Udine and Gorizia in the north-eastern Italian region of Friuli-Venezia Giulia.

It is well known for its beaches (such as those of Grado, Grado Pineta, Lignano Sabbiadoro, Lignano Pineta and Lignano Riviera), and for its lagoons (such as those of Grado and Marano Lagunare). There is a unique example of industrial archaeology at Torviscosa. Palmanova is a small renaissance town shaped as a star. The  Roman and medieval  town of Aquileia is of great historical importance. Monfalcone has important shipyards.

Geographical, historical and cultural regions of Italy
Province of Udine
Geography of Friuli-Venezia Giulia